DWDC (101.3 FM), broadcasting as 101.3 Big Sound FM, is a radio station owned and operated by Vanguard Radio Network. The station's studio and transmitter are located at J. P. Rizal St., Solano, Nueva Vizcaya. This is the pioneer FM station in the province.

References

Radio stations established in 1981
Radio stations in Nueva Vizcaya